Kalâat Khasba is a town and commune in the Kef Governorate, Tunisia. As of 2014 it had a population of 2,558, compared to 2,871 in 2004. Kalâat Khasba is the chief town of Kalâat Khasba Delegation, which had a population of 7,353 people in 2004.

See also
List of cities in Tunisia

References

Populated places in Tunisia
Communes of Tunisia
Tunisia geography articles needing translation from French Wikipedia